"Susie Q" is a song by musician Dale Hawkins recorded  late in the rockabilly era in 1957.  He wrote it with bandmate Robert Chaisson, but when released, Stan Lewis, the owner of Jewel/Paula Records and whose daughter Susan was the inspiration for the song, and Eleanor Broadwater, the wife of Nashville DJ Gene Nobles, were credited as co-writers to give them shares of the royalties.

Original version 
Hawkins cut "Susie Q" at the KWKH Radio station in Shreveport, Louisiana. "Susie Q" was a late rockabilly song which captured the spirit of Louisiana and featured guitar work by James Burton, who also worked with Ricky Nelson and later with Elvis Presley, among others.

Sometime after the recording, the master tape of "Susie Q" was sold to Checker Records in Chicago, which released it as a 45 RPM single in May 1957. The single peaked at numbers 7 and 27 on Billboard magazine's Hot R&B Sides and Hot 100 charts, respectively. In Canada, the song reached number 16 in the CHUM Charts.

Hawkins' original version is also included in the Rock and Roll Hall of Fame's "500 Songs that Shaped Rock and Roll" and in Robert Christgau's "Basic Record Library" of 1950s and 1960s recordings, published in Christgau's Record Guide: Rock Albums of the Seventies (1981).

Creedence Clearwater Revival version

Creedence Clearwater Revival released a version on their debut album in 1968. The band's only Top 40 hit not written by John Fogerty, it peaked at number 11 for one week in November 1968. This song was their first big hit.  The album version clocks in at 8:37. The single is split into parts one and two on its A and B sides, respectively. The jam session during the coda is omitted in part one. Instead, it fades out with the guitar solo right before the coda, which fades in with part two on the B-side. Fogerty plays the main riff from "Smokestack Lightning" after the second verse.

Fogerty told Rolling Stone magazine in 1993 that he recorded "Suzie Q" to get the song played on KMPX, a funky progressive-rock radio station in San Francisco, which is why it was extended to eight minutes.

The CCR version of the song was first certified Gold by the RIAA on December 13, 1990, for half a million copies shipped, and Platinum on May 10, 2019, for a million copies in sales and streams.

Charts

Other versions

Ronnie Hawkins, Dale's cousin, released a version of the song in the early 60's with the Hawks, later known as The Band, backing him. King Curtis also played tenor saxophone on the record.

The Rolling Stones
There is a short cover of "Susie Q" by The Rolling Stones on their US album 12 x 5, which was released in 1964. It also appears on the UK album The Rolling Stones No. 2 released in January 1965.

The Trashmen
The Trashmen played a live cover of "Susie Q" in 1965 released on the album "Teen Trot: Live At Ellsworth, WI - August 22, 1965". Their vocalist mistakenly attributed the song to The Rolling Stones during stage banter after playing the song.

Johnny Rivers
Johnny Rivers featured a four-minute version of "Suzie Q" on his live 1965 album Meanwhile Back at the Whisky à Go Go.

Bobby Vee
Bobby Vee included a version of "Susie Q" on his 1961 Liberty album With Strings and Things.

José Feliciano
In 1970, Puerto Rican musician José Feliciano released his version of "Susie Q" as a single which reached number 84 on the Billboard Hot 100. His version was rearranged and features several different lyrics.

The Everly Brothers
The Everly Brothers recorded a medley of "Susie Q" and The Beatles' "Hey Jude" for their 1970 live album The Everly Brothers Show.

Bobby McFerrin
In 1988, American singer Bobby McFerrin published an all vocal-version of "Susie Q" on his breakthrough album Simple Pleasures.   He re-composed all instrumental parts into backing vocals, all sung by himself, and also sang the main part.

Suzi Quatro
American singer-songwriter Suzi Quatro released two different versions of the song on the albums Oh Suzi and Unreleased Emotion.

Stack Waddy
Blues band Stack Waddy recorded the song in their record for Dandelion Records, the record company of John Peel.

The Chuck Fenech Band
The American blues-rock group The Chuck Fenech Band covered the song on their 2011 release Tax Free EP.

Johnny Winter

Rockpalast concert, 1979

References

External links
  1939 song, "Susie-Q" by John Lee "Sonny Boy" Williamson

1957 songs
1957 singles
1968 singles
Checker Records singles
Creedence Clearwater Revival songs
Fantasy Records singles
1970 singles
José Feliciano songs
Rockabilly songs